Vvedenka is an urban-type settlement in Chuhuiv Raion of Kharkiv Oblast in Ukraine. It is located on the left bank of the Udy, a tributary of the Donets. Vvedenka belongs to Novopokrovka settlement hromada, one of the hromadas of Ukraine. Population:

Economy

Transportation
41 km railway station is located in Vvedenka. It is on the railway connecting Kharkiv and Kupiansk. There is regular passenger traffic.

The settlement has road access to Highway M03 connecting Kharkiv and Sloviansk.

References

Urban-type settlements in Chuhuiv Raion